SS Peleus was a steam merchant ship built in 1928 by William Gray & Company of West Hartlepool. 
Originally named Egglestone, she was acquired by E. E. Hadjilias, Syros and renamed after Pēleús, the mythical King of Aegina, and father of Achilles. Peleus was sold in 1933 to the Nereus Steam Navigation company. She had an uneventful career in peacetime, until the Second World War. She worked under charter for the British government during the war, and operated in the South Atlantic, until her loss in March 1944 when she was torpedoed and sunk by U-852.

The Peleus Incident

In March 1944 Peleus was travelling from Freetown to Buenos Aires in ballast under the command of her captain, Minas Mavris. On this trip she had a crew of 35 men, mostly Greek (18), but also British (8), Chinese (3), Egyptian (2), and four others.
On the evening  of 13 March 1944 she was spotted by U-852, which was en route to her patrol area in the Indian Ocean.

Despite the secret nature of  U-852’s  mission, her captain Heinz-Wilhelm Eck decided to attack the Peleus; tracking her until nightfall, U-852 closed with her target on the surface and fired two torpedoes at close range. Peleus was hit, the first exploding in the number two hold, the second just aft in the number three hold.  She quickly broke up, sinking in three minutes; all that was left of her was flotsam, including several liferafts, and the survivors of her crew, perhaps half their number.

Eck took two men aboard for interrogation, Agis Kefalas, the Third Officer, and Pierre Neuman, a seaman; having established her name and details, he returned them to their raft.  At this point Eck decided he must hide the evidence of his action by destroying the debris, including the life-rafts (and, by implication, the men on them).  For the next five hours, until 1 A.M. on the 14th, U-852 moved around the debris field, firing with her guns, small arms and grenades.  Despite these efforts, not all the wreckage was destroyed, and four of the crew survived, though one, Kefalas died later of a wound in his arm.

The other three survivors were Antonios Liossis, Chief Officer, Dimitrios Argiros, a seaman, and Rocco Said, a stoker.  After drifting for over a month, they were rescued on 20 April by the Portuguese vessel Alexandre Silva and taken to Lobito, in Angola. The incident was reported to British naval authorities, and affidavits taken from the three men. On 2 May 1944 U-852 was attacked and captured after running aground upon a reef at Cape Guardafui, northern Somalia, in the Indian Ocean; the surviving members of her crew were taken prisoner.

At the end of the war, in October 1945, five members of her crew were tried as war criminals and convicted. Three (Eck, August Hoffman, 2nd Watch Officer, and Walter Weispfennig, boat's doctor) were executed, and two others, Hans Lenz, Chief Engineer, and Wolfgang Schwender, Pilot, were imprisoned.

Gwyn Griffin's best-selling 1967 novel An Operational Necessity was based on the Peleus Incident.

References

 SS Peleus at Uboat.net
 Clay Blair : Hitler's U-Boat War [Volume 2]: The Hunted 1942–1945 (1998)  (2000 UK paperback ed.)

External links
 Submarine atrocities
 The Peleus affair at u-boat net

Ships built on the River Tees
Ships sunk by German submarines in World War II
Steamships
World War II merchant ships of Greece
1928 ships
World War II shipwrecks in the Atlantic Ocean
Maritime incidents in March 1944